The No Class Tour was the debut concert tour by American recording artist Machine Gun Kelly, in support of his debut album Lace Up. The tour was supported by Limp Bizkit on selected dates.

Set list
This set list is representative of the performance on October 8, 2014. It is not representative of all concerts for the duration of the tour.

"See My Tears"
"Breaking News"
"Chip Off the Block"
"Swing Life Away"
"EST 4 Life"
"Invincible"
"Warning Shot"
"Free The Madness"
"Wanna Ball"
"Wild Boy"
"Mind of a Stoner"
"Peso"
"Sail"

Tour dates

References

2014 concert tours
Machine Gun Kelly (musician) concert tours